The House of Zinzendorf and Pottendorf was the name of an old and important noble family whose origins are in Austria. It is not to be mistaken with the princely House of Sinzendorf, as the two don't share same ancestry.

History 
The family was firstly mentioned in 1114 in a document written by Hermann von Vohburg, Bishop of Augsburg. Apart from their possessions in Austria, they also reigned over the Lordship of Pottendorf in Baden, which was incorporated into their name as Zinzendorf und Pottendorf. In 1460 they were awarded with the title of Baron by Frederick III, Holy Roman Emperor, while in 1662 they were raised to the dignity of Imperial Count by Leopold I, Holy Roman Emperor.

Notable members 
 Countess Erdmuthe Dorothea von Zinzendorf und Pottendorf (1700-1756), German Pietist and hymn writer
 Countess Anna von Zinzendorf und Pottendorf (1715-1760), Moravian Brethren missionary (Missionarin) and lyrical poet
 Count Christian Renatus von Zinzendorf und Pottendorf, Leader of the Moravian Church (died 1752)
 Count Karl von Zinzendorf und Pottendorf (died 1813), official in the Austrian government and diarist
 Count Nicolaus Ludwig von Zinzendorf und Pottendorf (died 1760), European religious and social reformer

Properties of Zinzendorf und Pottendorf family 

Austrian noble families